Lavy is a surname. Notable people with the surname include:

 Thomas Lavy (1941–1995), American farmer
 Victor Lavy, Israeli economist

As nickname
 Lavy Pinto (1929–2020), Indian sprinter

See also
 Lavie (disambiguation)
 Lavies